The Alaska Policy Forum (APF) is a conservative, nonprofit think tank located in Anchorage, Alaska. The Alaska Policy Forum is a member of the State Policy Network.

History 
APF was started in 2009 and received Internal Revenue Service 501(c)(3) nonprofit status. In 2014, the group was entirely volunteer-run with no paid employees. Members of the AFP's board have included Nick Begich III, the grandson of former Representative Nick Begich and a candidate for Alaska's at-large congressional district in 2022.

Policy areas 
APF conducts and publishes research on education, taxes, health care, welfare, regulations, and state budget in Alaska. The group is active in education policy and is a proponent for increased school choice. The organization compiles and publishes the Performance Evaluation for Alaska's Schools (PEAKS) Assessment results. 

APF is most well known for publishing public sector payroll data.

Funding 
According to the organization's website, Alaska Policy Forum does not accept government funding or grants, but instead relies on donations from individuals and businesses. The Alaska Policy Forum was started with support from Donors Capital Fund and Donors Trust, two related donor-advised funds. The Alaska Policy Forum received $192,000 from Donors Trust in 2009 and 2010.

References

2009 establishments in Alaska
Conservative organizations in the United States
Non-profit organizations based in Anchorage, Alaska
Political and economic think tanks in the United States